Kronos Incorporated was an American multinational workforce management and human capital management cloud provider headquartered in Lowell, Massachusetts, United States, which employed more than 6,000 people worldwide.

In February 2020, the company announced a merger with Ultimate Software and that the combined company would be led by Aron Ain and be called Ultimate Kronos Group. The merger was officially completed on April 1, 2020.

History 

Kronos was founded in 1977 by Massachusetts Institute of Technology (MIT) and Simon Business School alumnus Mark S. Ain. Under Mark Ain's leadership, Kronos sustained one of the longest records of growth and profitability as a public company in software industry history.

In 1979, Kronos delivered the world's first microprocessor-based time clock and, in 1985, delivered its first PC-based time and attendance product.

In 1992, Kronos became a publicly-traded company on NASDAQ.

Aron Ain, succeeded his brother Mark Ain as chief executive officer in 2005.

In March 2007, Kronos went private again, bought out for US$1.74 billion by the lead investor Hellman & Friedman and the secondary investor JMI Equity.

In 2012, the Third Circuit Court of Appeals enforced a subpoena seeking production of documents by Kronos, Inc., in an administrative charge before the EEOC alleging disability discrimination. The charge was brought by an individual job applicant against Kroger Food Co., who did not hire the job applicant and used a Kronos assessment as part of its hiring process. Kronos, which was not a party to the litigation, objected to the EEOC's subpoena on the basis that the information requested was irrelevant, and production would require Kronos to disclose protected trade secret information.

In 2014, private equity firms Blackstone and GIC invested in Kronos alongside Hellman & Friedman and JMI Equity. In the transaction, Kronos was valued at $4.5 billion. This was the first year that the company achieved $1 billion in annual revenue.

In 2017, Kronos moved its corporate headquarters from the nearby town of Chelmsford to the Cross Point Towers in Lowell, Massachusetts, consolidating multiple offices under one roof.

In February 2020, the company announced a merger with Ultimate Software and that the combined company will be led by Aron Ain.

In April 2020, as a response to the COVID-19 pandemic, Kronos introduced an automated report-generating tool to aid contact tracing. The tool analyzes work and attendance records of employees who test positive (or presumed positive) for COVID-19 to generate a report of potentially affected co-workers.

On December 13, 2021, Kronos announced that, on December 11, it was discovered that Kronos had been subject to a ransomware attack which disabled the functionality of the Kronos Private Cloud software for "up to several weeks". This breach forced many Kronos customers including municipalities, universities, and private employers to resort to alternative methods, including issuance of paper checks, to properly pay their employees.

Products

Originally a manufacturer of time clocks, the majority of Kronos' revenue is now derived from software and services. The company provides cloud applications for workforce management and human capital management, as well as consulting, education, and support services to its customers.

Acquisitions 
Kronos has conducted a number of acquisitions, with some of the most notable including: 
 Principal Decision Systems International (PDSI)
 The Workforce Solutions software division of SimplexGrinnell
 Stromberg
 3i Systems
 SaaShr.com 
 Time Link International Corporation (TimeLink)
 Empower Software Solutions
 Financial Management Solutions, Inc. (FMSI) 
 Digital Instinct Pty. Limited
 OptiLink

References

External links 
 

Business software companies
Software companies based in Massachusetts
Companies based in Lowell, Massachusetts
Software companies established in 1977
Human resource management software
Cloud computing providers
Multinational companies headquartered in the United States
Privately held companies based in Massachusetts
1977 establishments in Massachusetts
American companies established in 1977
1992 initial public offerings
2007 mergers and acquisitions
2020 mergers and acquisitions
Private equity portfolio companies
Defunct software companies of the United States